Piątkowo may refer to the following places:
 Piątkowo, Poznań, a neighbourhood of the city of Poznań
 Piątkowo, Chełmno County in Kuyavian-Pomeranian Voivodeship (north-central Poland)
 Piątkowo, Golub-Dobrzyń County in Kuyavian-Pomeranian Voivodeship (north-central Poland)
 Piątkowo, Pomeranian Voivodeship (north Poland)

See also 
 Piątków
 Piątkowski